Chaminade University of Honolulu is a private Marianist university in Honolulu, Hawaii. Founded in 1955 by the Society of Mary, Chaminade is located in Kaimuki, Honolulu at the base of St. Louis Heights. Chaminade offers bachelor's degrees in 23 fields of study and 5 master's degree programs. Chaminade University is accredited by the WASC Senior College and University Commission.

History

Chaminade University of Honolulu was named after Father William Joseph Chaminade, a French Catholic priest who survived persecution during the French Revolution.  He founded the Society of Mary in 1817.  In 1849, Marianists sent missionaries to the United States to serve immigrant populations.  In September 1883, eight Marianist priests arrived in Honolulu and established Saint Louis School, today a middle and high school for boys.  With the encouragement of Saint Louis alumni, the Marianists established a university to serve the educational needs of local Hawai'i Catholics.  They opened Saint Louis Junior College in 1955.  Upon becoming a four-year institution, the school changed its name to Chaminade College in 1957.  When graduate programs were added in 1977, Chaminade College changed its name to Chaminade University of Honolulu.

Marianist traditions
The Society of Mary (Marianists) is a religious order of brothers and priests following in the vision of Father William Joseph Chaminade, the founder of the Society of Mary.  Since Father Chaminade believed schools were instrumental in changing society, Marianist schools today focus on the education of the whole person, realizing the importance of both faith and reason, and preparing students for entry into their chosen careers.  Chaminade's approach to education is founded in the Marianist education values:

 Educate for formation in faith
 Provide an excellent education
 Educate in family spirit
 Educate for service, justice and peace
 Educate for adaptation to change

Campus
Chaminade's main campus, serving the undergraduate program and graduate program, is at the base of St. Louis Heights, a residential division of the Kaimuki district.  Chaminade is approximately two miles outside Waikiki and four miles from Downtown Honolulu.

After receiving a large grant in 2003, the campus underwent extensive renovation and construction. This included the construction of the Sullivan Family Library, and the Dr. Lawrence K.W. and Mrs. BoHing Chan Tseu Center for Nursing Education.

Chaminade's accelerated evening and online program (Adult Evening and Online Program) offers evening courses for nine degree programs at satellite locations on local military bases, community colleges and community centers.

Academics
Chaminade's undergraduate program offers hands-on learning in a traditional classroom setting.  Notable programs in the day program include forensic sciences, criminology and criminal justice, biology/pre-medicine and nursing.

The Nursing Program welcomed its first class of students at the start of the Fall 2010 semester.  The Nursing Program was approved by the Hawai'i State Board of Nursing in March 2010. Named the Sallie Y. Miyawaki School of Nursing, Chaminade's four-year program provides a contemporary curriculum characterized by sophisticated, simulated patient care experiences, informatics, genomics and cultural competency.

The Adult Evening and Online Program (AEOP) offers accelerated courses for non-traditional students who wish to take classes in the evening and online.  Programs offered through AEOP include: Management, Criminology and Criminal Justice, Early Childhood Education, and Psychology.

Chaminade offers six graduate degree programs: Master of Business Administration (MBA), Master of Education (MED), Master of Pastoral Theology (MPT), Master of Science in Criminal Justice Administration (MSCJA), Master of Science in Counseling Psychology (MSCP), and Master of Science in Forensic Sciences (MSFS).

Chaminade University's Business program is among the top in the Pacific. They offer MBAs in management, accounting, not for profit and public sector. The school also houses the Hogan Entrepreneurial Program, which is the leading program for top business thinkers in the state of Hawaii.

Chaminade University of Honolulu Montessori Teacher Education Program is accredited by Montessori Accreditation Council for Teacher Education (MACTE) and affiliated with American Montessori Society (AMS).

Athletics

Chaminade University of Honolulu competes in the National Collegiate Athletic Association (NCAA) Division II as a member of the Pacific West Conference, a nine-member athletic conference with members located in California, Hawaii, and Utah. Chaminade University fields teams in baseball, basketball, cross country, golf for men, softball, tennis, and volleyball for women. In the fall of 2006 men's and women's soccer were added for the first time as well as women's basketball.  Chaminade University of Honolulu's team name is the "Silverswords," a reference to a Hawaiian plant prized for its beauty and ability to withstand harsh conditions.

Student life

Diversity
Chaminade's student body is 66% Asian/Pacific Islander, 18% White, 6% Hispanic, 4% Black, 2% Non-Resident Alien, and 0.7% American Indian/Alaska Native.  Additionally, Chaminade University is a Native Hawaiian Serving Institution, offering a Native Hawaiian emphasis of study in the Behavioral Studies Program, Native Hawaiian culture resources, and scholarships for students of Native Hawaiian ancestry.

Clubs and organizations
Chaminade students have the opportunity to participate in a variety of clubs and organizations, with over 30 clubs represented on campus.  Clubs include student government, clubs for specific majors, and a variety of cultural clubs.  Each year, members of the Samoan, Hawaiian, Micronesian, Tahitian, and Marianas clubs participate in the Pacific Island Review, an event showcasing the traditional ethnic dances of the Pacific Islands.

Residence halls
Chaminade offers on and off campus housing facilities for approximately 400 students.  On-campus dorms include Hale Lokelani, Hale Pohaku and Keiffer Hall. Keiffer Hall is the only single sex dorm, offering housing for first-year and upper-class women.  Hale Lokelani and Hale Pohaku are co-ed, suite style dorms available to first-year students (freshman status).  Off-campus dorms are apartment style living facilities with full kitchens and living rooms.  The off-campus dorms are intended for upper class students and are within a mile from campus.  The off-campus facilities are: Waialae Avenue, Date Street and Iolani Terrace.

References

External links
 Official website
 Official athletics website

 
Marianist universities and colleges
Educational institutions established in 1955
Schools accredited by the Western Association of Schools and Colleges
Buildings and structures in Honolulu
Education in Honolulu
1955 establishments in Hawaii
Catholic universities and colleges in Hawaii
Association of Catholic Colleges and Universities
Roman Catholic Diocese of Honolulu
Maui Invitational